Yegor Sergeyevich Kholodilov (born 6 May 1999) is a Russian football player.

Club career
He made his debut in the Russian Football National League for FC Luch-Energiya Vladivostok on 12 November 2017 in a game against FC Shinnik Yaroslavl.

References

External links
 Profile by Russian Football National League

1999 births
Sportspeople from Vladivostok
Living people
Russian footballers
FC Luch Vladivostok players
FC Sakhalin Yuzhno-Sakhalinsk players
FC Dynamo Barnaul players
Association football forwards